Embelia ribes, commonly known as false black pepper, white-flowered embelia, vidanga, vaividang, vai vidang, or vavding, is a species in the family Primulaceae. It was originally described by Nicolaas Laurens Burman in his 1768 publication, Flora Indica.  It is widely distributed throughout India.  In Ayurveda and Siddha, it is considered widely beneficial in variety of diseases  In particular embelin isolated from dried berries of Embelia ribes has a wide spectrum of biological activities.

References

External links
 Jalalpure SS; Alagawadi KR; Mahajanashetti, Shah BN; Salahuddin; Singh V; Patil J.K, In Vitro Anthelmintic Property of Various Seeds Oils Against Pheritima posthuma, Indian Journal of Pharmaceutical Sciences. 2007 Jan-Feb; 69(1): 158-0 
 Contains a detailed monograph on Embelia ribes (Vidanga), as well as a discussion of health benefits and usage in clinical practice. Available online at https://web.archive.org/web/20120620164521/http://www.toddcaldecott.com/index.php/herbs/learning-herbs/343-vidanga

Primulaceae
Plants described in 1768
Plants used in Ayurveda
Taxa named by Nicolaas Laurens Burman